This is a list of navigable canals that are at least partially located in Poland. 

 Augustów Canal
 Bachorze Canal first mention 1297 
 Bydgoszcz Canal
 Bystry Canal
 Danube–Oder Canal
 Elbląg Canal
 Finow Canal
 Gliwice Canal
 Jagiellon's Canal near Elbląg, built in 1494
 Kłodnica Canal
 Łączański Canal near Cracow
 Masurian Canal
 Młynówka Malborska or Jurand's Canal, built in 1320
 Mosiński Canal
 Notecki Canal
 Piast Canal
 Przekop
 Szlak Batorego
 Ślesiński Canal
 Żerański Canal
 Wołczkowski Canal

See also
Transport in Poland
List of rivers of Poland
Map of canals of Poland on the website of the Polish National Water Management Authority

 
Poland
Canals
Canals
Canals